Mirza Yusuf Nersesov or Mirza Yusif Qarabaghi, born Hovsep Nersisyants, was an Armenian historian, translator, and writer in the 19th century.

Life 
Hovsep Nersisyants was born in Hadrut in 1798 to a family of blacksmiths. Together with several teenagers from noble Armenian families of Hadrut, he was taken to Iran by Qajar troops during Russo-Persian War of 1804–1813. There he was converted to Islam and received the name Yusuf and was sent to study in Tabriz. After completing his studies, he mastered the Persian and Arabic languages, received the title of "Mirza" and was appointed a clerk in the divan (office) of the ruler of Qaradagh Amir Khan Davalu-Qajar, who was later killed in the war of 1826. He married an Azerbaijani woman in Tabriz at the same time.

After the end of the second Russian-Persian war, in accordance with the peace treaties of Gulistan (1813) and Turkmenchay (1828), the Armenians expelled earlier to Iran were allowed to return to Eastern Armenia, which came under the control of Russia. Thus, Mirza Yusif found himself in Karabakh again.

After returning to Karabakh, he started to teach Persian at a school in Shusha and was baptized by Baghdasar Hasan-Jalalian, Primate of Karabakh. His Azerbaijani wife divorced him and later married a Muslim from Karabakh. Mirza Yusuf's second wife was a Karabakh Armenian woman named Shoghakat. During the first period of his return to Karabakh, Mirza Yusif wrote under pseudonym “Agarskiy” and only later began to sign “Karabakhi”, and in Russian “Shushinskiy”.

He entered into service of Grigol Orbeliani as a translator in Dagestan and corresponded with Imam Shamil and other Caucasian khans in the Arabic language for him. He completed his book named “Collection of Poems by Vagif and His Other Contemporaries”, consisting of poems authored by Karabakhi poets like Molla Panah Vagif and Gasim bey Zakir there in 1856, a book he was preparing since 1828. At the same time, he also prepared Darband-namah for a certain Hakob Lazariants, a member of the Russian army.

His most prominent work is known as Tārīkh-i Sāfī (Truthful History) which he completed in 1855. Surviving in only one manuscript, the book deals mainly with history of Karabakh region, the melikdoms of Karabakh and the Russian conquest of the Caucasus. This book was translated from Persian to Azerbaijani in 1991 and to Armenian in 2000. A Persian language version was also printed in Tehran in 2011.

After three years of service in Dagestan, Mirza Yusif returned to Shusha, where he died in 1864.

References

External links 
 Truthful History (Full Text in English)
 Karabakhnames (Full Text in Azerbaijani)

1798 births
1864 deaths
People from Karabakh
Armenian people from the Russian Empire
19th-century Armenian historians
Converts to Islam from Christianity
Converts from Armenian Apostolic Church
People of Qajar Iran
19th-century Persian-language writers
Persian Armenians
People of the Russo-Persian Wars
Translators from the Russian Empire